San Martino del Lago is a comune (municipality) in the Province of Cremona in the Italian region Lombardy, located about  southeast of Milan and about  southeast of Cremona.

San Martino del Lago borders the following municipalities: Ca' d'Andrea, Cingia de' Botti, Scandolara Ravara, Solarolo Rainerio, Voltido. The municipal seat is in the frazione of Cà de' Soresini.

References

Cities and towns in Lombardy